Taurinensis (minor planet designation: 512 Taurinensis), provisional designation , is a stony asteroid and large Mars-crosser on an eccentric orbit from the inner regions of the asteroid belt, approximately 20 kilometers in diameter. It was discovered on 23 June 1903, by astronomer Max Wolf at the Heidelberg-Königstuhl State Observatory in southwest Germany. The asteroid was named after the Italian city of Turin. It is the 4th-largest Mars-crossing asteroid.

Orbit and classification 

Taurinensis is a Mars-crossing asteroid, a dynamically unstable group between the main belt and the near-Earth populations, crossing the orbit of Mars at 1.666 AU. It orbits the Sun at a distance of 1.6–2.7 AU once every 3 years and 3 months (1,183 days). Its orbit has an eccentricity of 0.25 and an inclination of 9° with respect to the ecliptic.

Physical characteristics 

Taurinensis is a common, stony S-type asteroid in both the Tholen and SMASS classification.

Rotation period 

In 1982, the asteroid was observed using photometry from the La Silla Observatory to generate a composite light curve. The resulting data showed a rotation period of 0.2326 days (5.58 h) with a brightness variation of 0.2 in magnitude.

Diameter and albedo 

According to the surveys carried out by the Infrared Astronomical Satellite IRAS, the Japanese Akari satellite and the NEOWISE mission of NASA's Wide-field Infrared Survey Explorer, Taurinensis measures between 18.70 and 23.09 kilometers in diameter and its surface has an albedo between 0.1772 and 0.270. The Collaborative Asteroid Lightcurve Link adopts the results obtained by IRAS, that is, an albedo of 0.1772 and a diameter of 23.09 kilometers based on an absolute magnitude of 10.72.

With a mean-diameter of 20 kilometers, Taurinensis is the 4th-largest Mars-crossing asteroids, just behind 132 Aethra (43 km), 323 Brucia (36 km) and 2204 Lyyli (25 km), and larger than 1508 Kemi (17 km), 1474 Beira (15 km) and 1310 Villigera (14 km).

Naming 

This minor planet was named after "Taurinensis", the Latin name of the city of Turin, located in northern Italy. It was named in 1905, by astronomers of the Observatory of Turin with the discoverer's endorsement. The official naming citation was mentioned in The Names of the Minor Planets by Paul Herget in 1955.

References

External links 
 Asteroid Lightcurve Database (LCDB), query form (info )
 Dictionary of Minor Planet Names, Google books
 Asteroids and comets rotation curves, CdR – Observatoire de Genève, Raoul Behrend
 Discovery Circumstances: Numbered Minor Planets (1)-(5000) – Minor Planet Center
 
 

000512
Discoveries by Max Wolf
Named minor planets
000512
000512
19030623